The 2009 IIHF World U18 Championship Division III was an international under-18 ice hockey competition organised by the International Ice Hockey Federation. Both Division III tournaments made up the fourth level of competition of the 2009 IIHF World U18 Championships. The Group A tournament took place between 27 February and 5 March 2009  in Taipei, Taiwan and the Group B tournament took place between 9 and 15 March 2009 in Erzurum, Turkey. Australia and Iceland won the Group A and B tournaments respectively and gained promotion to Division II of the 2010 IIHF World U18 Championships.

Group A

The following teams took part in Group A of Division III tournament, which was played in Taipei, Taiwan at Annex Ice Rink from February 27 through March 5, 2009.

 is promoted to Division II for the 2010 IIHF World U18 Championships

Results

All times local

Group B
The following teams took part Group B of the Division III tournament, which was played in Erzurum, Turkey at GSIM Yenişehir Ice Hockey Hall from March 9 through March 15, 2009.

 is promoted to Division II for the 2010 IIHF World U18 Championships

Results

All times local

Bronze medal game

Gold medal game

See also
 List of sporting events in Taiwan

References

IIHF World U18 Championship Division III
World
Sport in Erzurum
International ice hockey competitions hosted by Turkey
Youth ice hockey in Turkey
III